K.C. Undercover is an American comedy television series created by Corinne Marshall that aired on Disney Channel from January 18, 2015 to February 2, 2018. The series stars Zendaya, Veronica Dunne, Kamil McFadden, Trinitee Stokes, Tammy Townsend, and Kadeem Hardison.

Series overview

Episodes

Season 1 (2015–16)

Season 2 (2016–17)

Season 3 (2017–18)

References 

Lists of American children's television series episodes
Lists of American comedy television series episodes
Lists of Disney Channel television series episodes